Petar Kružić (died 1537) was a Croatian knez, captain, soldier and defender of Klis, and the captain of Senj.

In the early 16th century Petar Kružić (knez of Klis) defended the Klis Fortress against Turk invasion. He died in 1537 trying to break yet another siege of the Turks. After his death, the Klis defenders agreed to give the fortress to the Ottomans in exchange for their women, children and their own lives. In this way, the Ottomans finally conquered the Klis Fortress after almost two and a half decades of its successful defense.

Origin 
He was a native of Krug in Nebljuh, a district of the same-titled tribe in the župa of Lapac in Lika. However, later chroniclers, and historians, mostly for local patriotic reasons, tried to appropriate and present him as one of their countrymen because he enjoyed incredible popularity as an anti-Ottoman fighter, especially in the areas from which Klis defenders came (Poljica).

Military career 
He began his military career in 1513 when he joined the defending forces of Klis Fortress. In around 1518 or 1519 he was promoted to captain of the Klis Fortress by the ban Petar Berislavić. In 1521 he was named the Captain of Senj together with Grgur Orlović who was named co-captain of Klis. They were active at those duties together until the Battle of Mohács when Orlović died in battle against the Turks.

In February 1524 Turkish captain Mustafa laid a siege on Klis Fortress with around 3000 men. The fort managed to hold off the invasion for over two months, while Kružić went to Senj just days before the siege and gathered an army of 1500 foot soldiers, 60 cavalry, and 40 ships to flank the Turkish army. He arrived at the town of Solin the night of 10 April from where they launched an attack on the Turks, destroying their army. For this achievement he was rewarded with the castle Breznica by the King of Hungary Louis II.

From then on Klis was under constant threat from the Turkish armies. On 4 June 1532, while Kružić was seeking help from potential ally cities and states, a large Turkish army led by Venetian Nicola Querini took control of Klis with the help of traitors. However, soon afterward Kružić returned with 2000 men from the city of Ancona and took control of the fort. On 18 September he managed to take over a Turkish fort in Solin and tried to persuade the king Ferdinand I to build a fort there to take control of the area around Solin, but the king did not take any measures.

After several failed attempts, the Turks tried to take over Klis in 1535 via treason. They bribed Uskok Mate Tvrdosalić to let them in the city on the last day of the Carnival, but Tvrdosalić deceived them and informed the Klis defenders of the Turkish plan. When the Turks came as arranged he let them into fort where they were ambushed and killed.

By the end of August 1536, the Turks had gathered a large army and repaired the fortress in Solin that Kružić conquered in 1532 (and was subsequently forced to abandon), and had built two new forts to completely surround Klis. Since that time Klis was under constant attack by the Turks, but the Uskok defenders managed to hold them off. Help arrived in March 1537 when 3000 soldiers sent by Ferdinand I and 700 Italian soldiers sent by pope Paul III arrived. Petar Kružić led the armies and stormed the Turkish strongholds, managing to destroy two; while storming the third, Turkish captain Murat-beg came with 2000 men yelling and shouting, causing the German and Italian soldiers to begin fleeing towards the coast. Kružić was amongst the last to retreat and was surrounded by the Turkish forces, dying in the fierce battle.

After the death of their captain and suffering a lack of water supplies, the defenders of Klis surrendered to the Ottomans in exchange for their freedom. On 12 March 1537 the city and the fortress were released to Turkish control.  Many of the citizens left the town while the Uskoci went to the city of Senj, where they continued fighting the Turkish invaders.

Legacy
Kružić is known for constructing 118 steps leading from Rijeka to Trsat in 1531, known today colloquially as the Petar Kružić staircase, along with the chapel of Saint Nicholas near the church of Gospa Trsatska. He is considered to have formulated the basic principle of the Uskok strategy and by holding ships near Lovran for the supply of Klis defenders, he laid the foundation of the Uskok navy. Following his death, his Uskok soldiers subsequently took refuge in Senj, where they continued their operations.

See also 
 Hundred Years' Croatian–Ottoman War

References

External links 
 Historical Unit Kliški uskoci - Petar Kružić
 Historical Unit Kliški uskoci - History of Klis

Croatian soldiers
16th-century Croatian military personnel
Year of birth missing
1537 deaths
Croatian nobility
Croatian Roman Catholics
Military commanders of Croatian kingdoms
16th-century Croatian people